Trichocentrum, often abbreviated Trctm in horticulture, is a genus in the orchid family, Orchidaceae. Dancinglady orchid is a common name for plants in this genus. It was described by Stephan Ladislaus Endlicher and Eduard Friedrich Poeppig in 1836. This genus alone makes up the monogeneric Trichocentrum alliance, a quite distinct lineage of the subtribe Oncidiinae.

The 68 currently recognized species are epiphytes species are distributed in damp forests from Mexico and Florida to Argentina.

Description
The pseudobulbs are reduced. The obtuse, fleshy leaves are 9 cm long. They are broadly elliptic to ovate-lanceolate.

The large, showy flowers grow basally on a short peduncle in a single-flowered to few-flowered raceme. They are white, or white covered with maroon dots. The petals and sepals are similar.

The long lip carries a short spur. This feature distinguishes the genus from other Oncidiinae, in which the spur is an extension of the column. The short column has a pair of apical wings on the stigma. The anther often bears minute papillae. There are two waxy pollinia, connected to elongate stipes.

In horticulture
Trichocentrum species are highly appreciated by orchid growers; some consider them to be among the most beautiful orchids on earth. Culture of members of this genus is highly variable, ranging from the drought-tolerant and easy-to-grow Tiger-like Trichocentrum (T. tigrinum) to smaller and more delicate species.

In cultivation they are subject to rot unless provided with conditions similar to those they experience in the wild. Extensive research into the ecological profiles of individual species may be required to achieve success cultivating them. Many species from Central America apparently endure a prolonged drought for at least part of the year, and have developed succulent leaves to deal with these conditions. Plants may shrivel quite severely without long-lasting injury.

Chemistry and use as entheogen
The Central and South American species Trichocentrum cebolleta (known formerly as Oncidium cebolleta) has been found to contain a variety of phenanthrenoids. This species is of considerable ethnobotanical interest as one of only a handful of orchids reported to be used as an entheogens. T. cebolleta is used as a substitute for hikuli a.k.a. peyote (the hallucinogenic cactus Lophophora williamsii) by the Tarahumara of Northern Mexico - a tribe noted for the large number of hallucinogenic plants which it uses in various shamanic and running-related practices. The combination of phenanthrenoid content and employment as entheogens in shamanic practices is to be found also in the Asiatic orchids Vanda tessellata and Dendrobium macraei (- known formerly as Ephemerantha macraei and Flickingeria macraei - see page Flickingeria). The orchidaceous genera Trichocentrum, Vanda and Dendrobium are all members of the subfamily Epidendroideae and are also placed currently in the subgroup/clade of Higher Epidendroids within the subfamily. Stermitz et al., however, do not report any evidence or suggest that the phenanthrenoids from Trichocentrum possess psychoactive properties.

Systematics
There is disagreement as to the taxonomic status of some species that have recently been moved from Oncidium to Trichocentrum. Morphological characteristics of "typical" trichocentrums, such as being relatively small and squat with a short, few-to-several flowered inflorescence, contrasts sharply with the larger, heavier oncidiums with long, "mule-ear" leaves and showy, branched inflorescences with many flowers, or the "rat-tail" species with terete leaves.

While studies of molecular phylogeny has caused substantial reclassifications, it is uncertain whether this new scheme will be widely adopted. As with many plants, hybridisation might heavily confound cladistic analyses, though the exact extent is unknown. Hybridisation of Trichocentrum with Oncidium has resulted in the hybrid genus × Trichocidium for example, and similar events in the past would result in unrealistic assessments of relationship based on molecular phylogenetic studies with too limited a scope.

Species

 Trichocentrum aguirrei (Colombia)
 Trichocentrum albococcineum – White-scarlet Trichocentrum (N Brazil to Peru)
 Trichocentrum ascendens (Mexico to W South America)
 Trichocentrum aurisasinorum (Central America)
 Trichocentrum bicallosum (Oaxaca, Chiapas to Central America)
 Trichocentrum brachyceras (Colombia)
 Trichocentrum brevicalcaratum (Peru)
 Trichocentrum caloceras (Costa Rica)
 Trichocentrum candidum – White Trichocentrum (Veracruz to Chiapas to Central America)
 Trichocentrum capistratum – Halter Trichocentrum (Costa Rica to Venezuela)
 Trichocentrum carthagenense (Caribbean, Mexico to N Brazil)
 Trichocentrum cavendishianum (Mexico to Central America)
 Trichocentrum cebolleta (S Caribbean, Mexico to NE Argentina)
 Trichocentrum costaricense (Costa Rica)
 Trichocentrum cymbiglossum (Costa Rica)
 Trichocentrum dianthum Pupulin & Mora-Retana (Costa Rica)
 Trichocentrum estrellense (Costa Rica)
 Trichocentrum flavovirens (SW Mexico)
 Trichocentrum fuscum – Dark Trichocentrum (S Tropical America)
 Trichocentrum haematochilum (Trinidad)
 Trichocentrum hartii (Venezuela)
 Trichocentrum hoegei (Mexico: Veracruz, Guerrero, Oaxaca)
 Trichocentrum ionopthalmum (N Brazil)
 Trichocentrum johnii (Mexico)
 Trichocentrum jonesianum (Bolivia and Brazil to NE Argentina)
 Trichocentrum lacerum (C. America to Colombia)
 Trichocentrum lanceanum (Trinidad to S Tropical America)
 Trichocentrum leeanum (Colombia)
 Trichocentrum lindenii (Mexico to Guatemala)
 Trichocentrum longicalcaratum Rolfe
 Trichocentrum lowii (Guatemala)
 Trichocentrum luridum (Mexico to N South America)
 Trichocentrum margalegfii (SW Mexico)
 Trichocentrum × marvraganii (T. jonesianum × T. straceyi) (Bolivia)
 Trichocentrum mattogrossense (Brazil: Mato Grosso)
 Trichocentrum microchilum (Mexico: Chiapas to El Salvador)
 Trichocentrum morenoi (Peru to Bolivia)
 Trichocentrum nanum (S Tropical America)
 Trichocentrum neudeckeri (Bolivia)
 Trichocentrum nudum (Panama to Venezuela)
 Trichocentrum obcordilabium (Ecuador)
 Trichocentrum oestlundianum (SW Mexico)
 Trichocentrum orthoplectron (Colombia to N Brazil)
 Trichocentrum ostenianum (Paraguay)
 Trichocentrum panduratum (N Peru)
 Trichocentrum pfavii : Pfau's Trichocentrum (Central America)
 Trichocentrum pinelii (Brazil: Rio de Janeiro)
 Trichocentrum pohlianum (SE Brazil)
 Trichocentrum pongratzianum (Peru)
 Trichocentrum popowianum (Ecuador)
 Trichocentrum porphyrio (N Brazil)
 Trichocentrum pulchrum – Long-spurred Trichocentrum, Beautiful Trichocentrum (S Tropical America)
 Trichocentrum pumilum (Brazil to NE Argentina)
 Trichocentrum purpureum (Guyana)
 Trichocentrum recurvum (Guiana, Suriname)
 Trichocentrum silverarum (Panama)
 Trichocentrum splendidum (Guatemala)
 Trichocentrum sprucei (Suriname to Brazil)
 Trichocentrum stacyi (Bolivia)
 Trichocentrum stipitatum (Central America)
 Trichocentrum stramineum (Mexico: Veracruz)
 Trichocentrum teaguei (Bolivia)
 Trichocentrum tenuiflorum (NE Brazil)
 Trichocentrum teres (Costa Rica to Panama)
 Trichocentrum tigrinum – Tiger-like Trichocentrum (Central America to Peru)
 Trichocentrum undulatum (S Florida to N Brazil)
 Trichocentrum viridulum (Colombia)
 Trichocentrum wagneri (Brazil)
 Trichocentrum wittii (Bolivia)

References

Further reading
  (2001): Notes on the Caribbean orchid flora, 4. More combinations in Trichocentrum and Cyrtochilum.  Lindleyana 16(4): 225.
  (2001): Additional transfers to Trichocentrum Poepp. & Endl. and Otoglossum Garay & Dunst. (Orchidaceae: Oncidiinae).  Lindleyana 16(3): 218–219.
  (1995): A revision of the genus Trichocentrum (Orchidaceae: Oncidiinae).  Lindleyana 10(3): 183–210. URL
  (2001): Leaf anatomy of 16 taxa of the Trichocentrum clade (Orchidaceae: Oncidiinae).  Lindleyana 16(2): 81–93.
  (2001): Molecular systematics of the Oncidiinae based on evidence from four DNA sequence regions: expanded circumscriptions of Cyrtochilum, Erycina, Otoglossum, and Trichocentrum and a new genus (Orchidaceae).  Lindleyana 16(2): 113–139.

External links

 
Oncidiinae genera
Epiphytic orchids